The Daily Herald is a daily newspaper in Columbia, Tennessee. The newspaper is published six days a week Sunday through Friday; the paper does not publish on Saturday. Although it is primarily distributed to Maury County, Tennessee its Newspaper Designated Market (N.D.M.) stretches into five counties in Southern Middle Tennessee. The five county distribution area of The Daily Herald includes: Maury County, Tennessee; Marshall County, Tennessee; Lewis County, Tennessee; and the northern halves of both Giles County, Tennessee and Lawrence County, Tennessee.

History 
The Daily Herald was founded as a weekly newspaper in 1848, when Columbia's population was only 1,700 people. In 1899, the newspaper converted from weekly to daily delivery. The city now has a population 34,811 in 2010 with a county population exceeding 81,956. Weekday circulation (Monday-Friday) is 11,500 and Sunday circulation is 13,500, according to audited figures.

Ownership 
In 1916 the newspaper was purchased by Walter D. Hastings and James I. Finney. Beginning in 1965 the newspaper was purchased by local businessman and politician Sam Delk Kennedy who also served as publisher. Kennedy served as either Editor or Publisher or both from 1965 to 1983. It was acquired by the Donrey Media Group (founder Donald W. Reynolds) in 1983. Reynolds died in 1993. The company was then sold to the Stephens family of Arkansas, best known for their investment banking business Stephens Inc. in Little Rock, Arkansas. After Stephens acquired the group, some of Donrey's properties were sold off, and the company moved its headquarters to Las Vegas, home of its largest newspaper, the Las Vegas Review-Journal. The company was renamed Stephens Media Group in 2002. Most of Stephens newspapers operated in small to medium-sized towns and cities, but the company also owns the Las Vegas Review-Journal, a 186,000 circulation newspaper.

In June 2006 the company became officially known as Stephens Media LLC and continued Mr. Reynolds' business philosophy of locally operated companies.  Stephens Media LLC was a Nevada diversified media holding company that published over 11 daily and 64 weekly newspapers in nine states, primarily in Nevada and Arkansas.

In 2015, the Stephens Media newspapers were sold to New Media Investment Group. GateHouse Media a wholly owned subsidiary of New Media Investment Group that will be managing the portfolio of 125 Daily Newspapers and 575 Weekly Newspapers in 32 states throughout the U. S.

Recent Publishers 

Sam Kennedy served as the newspaper's publisher during the decades of the 1960s through 1983. Douglas Beel (from Arkansas) became the newspaper's publisher from 1983 until 1996. In 1996, Mark Palmer (from Oklahoma) was named publisher. Keith Ponder served as Publisher from October 2015 to April 2020. James Bennett served as editor from 2014 to September 2020. Major department heads at the newspaper currently include; Editor Keri Bartlett, Advertising Director Craig Duncan (who also serves as the General Manager of the Advertiser News of Spring Hill.

Subsidiary publications 
 The Advertiser News {Weekly} (Spring Hill & Thompson's Station, Tennessee) 
 The Value Guide  {Weekly}  (Maury County, Tennessee)
 Spring Hill Life  {Quarterly} (Spring Hill, Tennessee)
 Healthy Living  {Monthly} (Six Counties in Southern Middle Tennessee)

References

External links 
 
 Stephens Media LLC official website
 https://www.columbiadailyherald.com/story/news/2020/12/04/kerri-bartlett-new-editor-columbia-daily-herald-advertiser-news/3826932001/

Newspapers published in Tennessee
Maury County, Tennessee
Publications established in 1848
Daily newspapers published in the United States
1848 establishments in Tennessee
Gannett publications